Kenneth "Ken" James Appledorn (born in Troy, Michigan) is an American actor known for his work in the series The Refugees, a joint production of BBC Worldwide and Atresmedia and Arde Madrid, directed by Paco Leon for Movistar+. He is also known for his work in the film Casting as well as the film The Extraordinary Tale.

Biography 
Ken Appledorn grew up in Troy, Michigan, a suburb of Detroit. He is the youngest of four boys. He attended Troy High School where he participated in theatre and drama, however went on study business administration and Spanish at the University of Michigan Ross School of Business. Upon graduation he traveled to Sevilla, Spain and began studying theatre there at Teatro Viento Sur and El Centro Andaluz de Teatro (CAT).  He also spent time studing at the Royal Academy of Dramatic Art in London. His first break came when David Fernández Sainz-Rozas, creator of the series Malviviendo asked Appledorn to be the lead in a sketch comedy series "El viaje de Peter McDowell", centering on the adventures of an Englishman in the south of Spain. Due to its success (over 10 million views) Appledorn began appearing in several other Spanish television series and had a secondary character in the series "¡Qué buen puntito!" (2011), alongside two of Spain's best comedians, Los Morancos In 2007, Appledorn and Jorge Cadaval, one-half of the comedy duo Los Morancos, were married in Sevilla, Spain.

In 2013 Appledorn appeared in the film "Casting" which premiered at the Festival de Málaga de Cine Español, where he won the award for best secondary actor. That same year he also participated in the film "Obra 67", a film recorded in 13 hours that premiered at the Sevilla European Film Festival. Later that year he appeared in "The Extraordinary Tale of the Times Table", his first film as a leading man. He was nominated as best Spanish actor in the Andalucian Film Awards (ASECAN) as well as best actor at the Cardiff Film Festival. In 2015 was as a series regular in The Refugees, a joint production of BBC Worldwide and Atresmedia and in 2016 a series regular in "La Brigada de Fenómenos" shown on Canal Sur TV and ¨Entertainment¨ a web series seen by over 5 million viewers. In 2018, Appledorn filmed the series "Arde Madrid" as a series regular in the role of Bill Gallagher, Ava Gardner´s secretary. The series is produced by Movistar+  and directed by Paco Leon. In 2019, Appledorn filmed the thriller Malnazidos, produced by Sony Pictures and Mediaset directed by Javier Ruíz Caldera and Alberto del Toro and La Lista de Los Deseos directed by Alvaro Díaz Lorenzo.  In 2021 he recorded the film Official Competition, starring Penelope Cruz and Antonio Banderas and is working as a journalist in the show Como Sapiens.

Film 
2023: Un Hombre de Accion
2022: El universo de Óliver
2022: Héroes de barrio
2020: Malnazidos
2020:  Rifkin's Festival
2019: Bears love me!
2019: La lista
2018: Fishbone
2017: Lugares
2016: Todo es de color
2014: La ignorancia de la sangre
2014: Anochece en la India
2014: La tristeza de Kevin Brownie (Short)
2013: The Extraordinary Tale
2013: Obra 67
2013: Casting
2012: The Impostor
2009: Brain Drain
2009: Madre amadísima

Television 
2021: Now and Then
2021: Como Sapiens
2020: El último show
2019: Élite
2018: Arde Madrid
2018: Allí abajo
2016: Brigada de Fenómenos
2015: The Refugees (8 episodes)
2015: Entertainment
2009-2014: Malviviendo (4 episodes)
2013: Museo Coconut
2013: The Avatars
2013: Flaman (12 episodes)
2011: ¡Qué buen puntito! (20 episodes)
2011: Bandolera
2010: Aída
2009: Yo soy Bea

References

External links 
 
 Official Website of Ken Appledorn

1980 births
Living people
American people of Dutch descent
American gay actors
Ross School of Business alumni
University of Michigan alumni
Male actors from Michigan
People from Troy, Michigan
LGBT people from Michigan